James Arnold Deines (born September 26, 1962 in Springdale, Arkansas) is a former basketball player.  He is listed at 6'9" and played forward/center for the Arizona State University Sun Devils.    Entered the 1985 NBA Draft and was drafted by the Los Angeles Clippers in the 4th round (74th overall pick); however, he never got to play in the NBA. Deines instead played professionally in France for the rest of his basketball career.  He became a naturalized French citizen in 1987 and was on the roster of the French National Team that placed fourth in the 1991 FIBA European Basketball Championship.

Notable awards
 LNB Championship (1991) with Olympique Antibes

References

1962 births
Living people
American men's basketball players
Arizona State Sun Devils men's basketball players
French men's basketball players
Los Angeles Clippers draft picks
People from Springdale, Arkansas
SIG Basket players